
Many composers have written concerti in the key of G major. These include:

Harpsichord and piano concertos

Harpsichord Concerto BWV 1058 (J. S. Bach)
Piano Concerto No. 4 (Mozart)
Piano Concerto No. 17 (Mozart)
Piano Concerto No. 4 (Beethoven)
Piano Concerto No. 2 (Tchaikovsky)
Piano Concerto in G (Ravel)
Piano Concerto No. 2 (Bartók)
Piano Concerto No. 5 (Prokofiev)

Viola and violin concertos

Viola Concerto (Telemann)
Violin Concerto No. 4 (Haydn)
Violin Concerto No. 3 (Mozart)

Flute concertos

Flute Concerto No. 1 (Mozart)

See also
List of compositions for cello and orchestra
List of compositions for keyboard and orchestra
List of compositions for violin and orchestra